Baby Tate can refer to:

 Baby Tate (rapper), stage name of the American rapper, born Tate Sequoya Farris
 Baby Tate (guitarist) (1916–1972), American Piedmont blues guitarist